Mount Marilyn is a lunar mountain within the Montes Secchi, which separate Mare Fecunditatis to the east from Mare Tranquillitatis to the west.  It was named at about the time of the Apollo 8 mission to the Moon in 1968 by astronaut Jim Lovell for his wife, Marilyn. The name was informal until July 26, 2017, when it was officially recognized by the IAU. Its approximate position is 40 degrees E, 1.1 degrees N.

The small crater that has impacted the north tip of Mount Marilyn is known as Secchi O crater.  The small crater unofficially known as Weatherford (probably because Apollo 10 Commander Tom Stafford is from Weatherford, Oklahoma) is located just west of the north tip.

References

Secchi, Montes